William Arthur Mackenzie (1870 - 1942) was a Scottish poet, editor, artist and journalist, born in Invergordon, Scotland and educated at Marischal College, Aberdeen, later moving to London. Positions held included being the Secretary of the Royal Society of Arts and Secretary General of Save the Children International (1920 - 1939). Author of detective stories, poems, and also a contributor to Punch.

References

Scottish poets
Scottish journalists
1870 births
1942 deaths
Scottish artists